Cymaroa is a monotypic of tiger moth genus in the family Erebidae erected by George Hampson in 1905. Its only species, Cymaroa grisea, was described by Carl Peter Thunberg in 1784. It is found in Lesotho, Namibia and South Africa.

References

Spilosomina
Moths described in 1784
Insects of Namibia
Fauna of Lesotho
Moths of Africa
Monotypic moth genera